Kailasanatha Kona or Kailasa kona is a waterfall  in Narayanavanam Mandal, Tirupati district , Andhra Pradesh in India. A temple of Lord Shiva and Parvathi is seen nearby. This waterfall is having a height of around 40 feet. The specialty of the falls is that, there is water all through the year.
There are 3 falls here. Apart from the main falls near the temple of Lord Shiva and Parvathi, there are two smaller falls with a height of approximately 4 to 6 feet, halfway through the main road to the main falls. These two smaller fall waters fells into small ponds.  One can take a bath here. There is no paved roads to these two falls.

How to reach 
Kailasakona Falls or Kone Falls is situated on the Uttukottai - Puttur - Tirupathi road. The main falls can be easily reached by car. There is ample space for more than 10 cars to be parked at the car parking. From the car parking, the main falls can be reached by 3 to 5 minutes walk, through well laid steps. This path is illuminated at night.

Kailasakona is located on the National Highway 40 of Kadapa to Chennai.

How to reach from Tirupathi
Tirupathi to Kailasakona would be 44 km. Bus or train transport is available from respective stations.

Bus route: Tirupathi to Satyavedu and need to get off at Kalisakona road stop to reach.

Train route: Tirupathi to Puttur and reach Puttur bus stop for direct buses and other alternatives.

How to reach from Chennai
Chennai to Kailasakona would be 70 km. Train transport is available from respective stations.

Bus route: Chennai to Tiruapthi or Chennai to Puttur and need to get off at Kalisakona road stop to reach.

Train route: Chennai to Puttur and reach Puttur bus stop for direct buses and other alternatives.

References

External links

Kailasakona Falls Alias Kone Falls

Waterfalls of Andhra Pradesh
Geography of Tirupati district
Tirupati district
Waterfalls of India